Toby is a masculine given name.  It may also refer to:

Places 
 Toby, Elk County, Pennsylvania, United States, an unincorporated community
 Mount Toby, Massachusetts, United States
 Toby Glacier, British Columbia, Canada
 Toby Township, Pennsylvania, United States, a town

Arts, entertainment, and media 
 Toby (album), a 1974 release by The Chi-Lites
 "Toby," a dialogue interlude from the Belle & Sebastian album Storytelling
Save Toby, humor website and book based around threatening to eat a rabbit named Toby
 Toby Jug, a pottery jug in the image of a human being, called a "Toby" in Cockney slang
 Toby: The Secret Mine, a 2015 video game

Other uses 
 Toby (surname)
 Toby, a fish from the genus Canthigaster
 Toby, a 2018 winter storm in North America

See also 
 Tobi (disambiguation)